Cottonwood Creek is a southeastward-flowing  tributary stream of San Luis Creek, originating in the eastern foothills of the Diablo Range in Merced County, California. The source of the creek is at  Red Hill, a summit on the eastern slope of the Diablo Range.

History
Cottonwood Creek, originally named by the Spanish Arroyo Alamos, was named for the Fremont cottonwood (Populus fremontii) trees which are still abundant along the lower creek.

Ecology and Conservation
The Upper and Lower Cottonwood Creek Wildlife Areas are administered by the California Department of Fish and Wildlife (CDFW), and bracket the historic mouth of Cottonwood Creek, now submerged as Cottonwood Bay on San Luis Reservoir. This area is now home to a herd of tule elk, visible from the Pacheco Pass (Highway 152), which dispersed there from 1978-1981 CDFW translocations of the large ungulates to the Hewlett-Packard San Felipe Ranch on Mt. Hamilton in Santa Clara County.

See also
 San Luis Reservoir

References

External links
 CDFW page for Cottonwood Creek Wildlife Area

Rivers of Merced County, California
Rivers of Northern California